T. Visvanatha Pillai Kamalaswamy (21 January 1911 – 25 March 1998) was an Indian politician from the Indian National Congress. He served as a member of the Rajya Sabha from Madras State (now Tamil Nadu) from 3 April 1952 to 2 April 1954 and 3 April 1954 to 2 April 1960.

Family 

Kadharsha was born on 6 October 1935 to T. S. Visvanatha Pillai. He married T. K. Saravanai Vadivoo Ammal and had one son and one daughter.

References 

 

1911 births
1998 deaths
Rajya Sabha members from Tamil Nadu